The College of Guienne was a school founded in 1533 in Bordeaux. The collège became renowned for the teaching of liberal arts between the years 1537 and 1571, attracting students such as Michel de Montaigne.

History
In 1533, the Jurade of Bordeaux (roughly equivalent to the city council) called teachers from Flanders and from Paris to create the Collège de Guyenne. On 15 July 1534 André de Gouveia, then rector of the University of Paris for the college of arts (liberal arts), was invited to be principal and was given full freedom to modernize the old college according to the Renaissance humanism ideals.

The College of Guienne had Latin studies, and introduction to Ancient Greek and Hebrew - like the contemporary Collège de France - On arrival, Gouveia proclaimed that he would not recognize differences of creed in staff and pupils, many of whom showed sympathy to the new doctrines of the Protestant Reformation.

There, in 1539, Gouveia welcomed George Buchanan, appointing him professor of Latin. Gouveia's stay at the College de Guyenne lasted until 1547, attracting students like Michel de Montaigne, who later in his Essays described Gouveia as " ...behind comparison the greatest principal in France." The fame of the teaching -mainly grammar, classical literature, history and philosophy -  was such that, in 1552, Italian scholar and physician Julius Caesar Scaliger sent his sons to the college, including Joseph Justus Scaliger.

The regulations of the Collège de Guyenne were published by Elie Vinet in 1583 under the title Schola Aquitanica.

Teachers
 André de Gouveia 
 Mathurin Cordier
 Élie Vinet 
 Guillaume Guérante
 George Buchanan
 Jean Visagier
 Jacques Peletier du Mans
 Robert Balfour
 Marc-Antoine Muret
 Nicolas de Grouchy
 Mark Alexander Boyd

Alumni
 Michel de Montaigne
 Étienne de La Boétie
Louis William Valentine DuBourg
 Joseph Justus Scaliger
 Francisco Sanches

See also
Collège de France

References

Educational institutions established in the 1550s
1533 establishments in France